Zinc finger with KRAB and SCAN domains 4 is a protein that in humans is encoded by the ZKSCAN4 gene.

References

Further reading